The Sonoma Range is a small mountain range in northwest Nevada, USA. It lies just south of the Humboldt River between Winnemucca and Golconda. It is one of the many ranges of the basin and range geologic province of the Great Basin.

The range's name is a transfer from Sonoma County in California.

Notes 

Mountain ranges of Nevada
Range, Sonoma
Mountain ranges of Humboldt County, Nevada
Mountain ranges of Pershing County, Nevada